Hunayn is a location in the Hijaz, Saudi Arabia, close to the city of Ta’if. It is located between Mecca and Ta’if in the Sarawat Mountains.

The location, on the Road from Meccah to Ta’if Road, is a wide arid valley surrounded by barren, rocky mountains. The Battle of Hunayn took place here.

See also

 Awtas
 Badr, Saudi Arabia
 Wadi Hunayn, Ash-Sham

References

Mecca Province